Levan Gogoberidze (21 January 1896 – 21 March 1937) was a Soviet and Georgian politician. He served as First Secretary of the Georgian Communist Party from May to 19 November 1930. He was replaced as First Secretary because of accusations he was too leftist and was replaced by Samson Mamulia. In 1937 he was shot as part of the Great Purge.

Notes

References
 

1896 births
1937 deaths
20th-century politicians from Georgia (country)
First Secretaries of the Georgian Communist Party
Great Purge victims from Georgia (country)
People from Kutais Governorate
Soviet politicians